DORF is a film festival featuring music documentary films. The festival was started in 2007 and was organized by Association of movie fans "RARE" in Vinkovci. The festival is held annually in the first half of March. Movies of all formats are selected in three categories—regional, international and out of competition. DORF largely concentrates on covering regional documentary production, and after several years of activity, it opened to international works, and became a member of  the Association of music film festivals.
 
DORF is hosted simultaneously in Vinkovci and Rijeka, in a variety of venues. Previous guests of the festival include Don Letts, who attended in 2008 and presented his movie on The Clash, Donald McGlynn, Vincent Moon, David Kleijwegt, Peter Braatz... In addition to screenings, its off programme comprises photography and painting art exhibitions, workshops, concerts, book promotions and round tables.

Each year after the festival, DORF goes touring to other countries and cities in this region—in 7 years, highlights of the festival were presented in 69 cities throughout Croatia, Serbia, Slovenia, Macedonia and Bosnia and Herzegovina. In 2013 DORF was presented in Vienna, Austria

References 
 www.filmfestivaldorf.com
 http://www.musicfilmweb.com/events/dorf/
 https://web.archive.org/web/20141219214713/http://www.havc.hr/hrvatski-film/festivali-u-hrvatskoj/popis-festivala/dorf-2014-festival-dokumentarnog-rock-filma
 https://web.archive.org/web/20120402185708/http://croatia.hr/en-GB/Activities-and-attractions/Events/Event/Town/Vinkovci/Culture/Festival/DORF-%E2%80%93-Festival-of-Documentary-Rock-Film?ZXZcNDI4
 http://eng.exitfest.org/index.php?option=com_content&task=view&id=2012
 https://web.archive.org/web/20111011130853/http://www.palicfilmfestival.com/eng/component/content/article/34-news/117-documentary-film-workshop-at-the-eff-palic.html
 https://web.archive.org/web/20120425063513/http://en.splitculture.hr/dorf-opened-new-season-of-cinematheque/66

Recurring events established in 2007
Film festivals in Croatia
Documentary film festivals in Croatia
2007 establishments in Croatia
Spring (season) events in Croatia